Sigitas Jakubauskas (born 29 December 1958 in Kaunas) is a retired Soviet and Lithuanian football player.

International career
Jakubauskas played his only game for USSR on 7 August 1985 in a friendly against Romania.

Honours
 Lithuanian Footballer of the Year: 1982

References

External links
  Profile 

1958 births
Living people
Lithuanian footballers
Soviet footballers
Soviet Union international footballers
FK Žalgiris players
Sportspeople from Kaunas
VfB Remscheid players
Soviet Top League players
2. Bundesliga players
Lithuanian expatriate footballers
Expatriate footballers in Germany
Lithuanian expatriate sportspeople in Germany
Association football defenders
Association football forwards